The Seiyōkan was the Tōkyō residence of the Nabeshima clan from 1892 until its destruction in the 1923 Great Kantō earthquake.

History
After the return of Nabeshima Naohiro, eleventh and final daimyō of the Saga Domain, from ministerial duties in Italy in 1882, he approached the architect , first technical head of what is now Shimizu Corporation, to design a western-style building to serve as his Tōkyō residence. Construction began in 1884 and continued for three years, before being complicated by the architect's death. Tatsuno Kingo and, at one stage, Katayama Tōkuma were drafted in to oversee the remainder of the project, and works finished in 1892. On 9 July that year the Meiji Emperor visited, Empress Shōken attending the following day. The residence had a grand salon, large and small reception rooms, and a ballroom. It was destroyed in the Great Kantō earthquake in 1923.

See also
 Chōkokan

References

Nabeshima clan
Buildings and structures in Chiyoda, Tokyo
Buildings of the Meiji period
History of Tokyo